Brownwood High School is a public high school located in Brownwood, Texas, United States. It is part of the Brownwood Independent School District located in central Brown County, and is classified as a 4A school by the UIL. In 2015, the school was rated "Met Standard" by the Texas Education Agency.

Athletics
The Brownwood Lions compete in the following sports:

Baseball
Basketball
Cross country
Football
Golf
Powerlifting
Soccer
Softball
Tennis
Track and field
Volleyball

During the 1960s and 1970s, Brownwood had one of the most dominant football programs in Texas. Under the guidance of coach Gordon Wood, the Lions made the state finals eight times, winning titles on a state-record seven occasions.

State titles
Football
1960 (3A), 1965 (3A), 1967 (3A), 1969 (3A), 1970 (3A), 1978 (3A), 1981 (4A)
Boys' golf 
1955 (2A), 1985 (4A), 1986 (4A) 2017 (4A)
Boys' track 
1962 (3A)
UIL Academics - Accounting 
2003 Individual and Team (4A), 2004 Individual (4A), 2005 Individual and Team (4A), 2006 Individual and Team (4A), 2007 Team (4A), 2008 Individual and Team (4A)

State finalists
Boys' basketball
1949 (2A)
Football
1977 (3A)
Volleyball 
2008 (3A)

Classification
Brownwood competes in class 4A in a district with Big Spring, Andrews, Lubbock Estacado, and San Angelo Lakeview.

Theatre
The Theatre Department at Brownwood High School is headed by Shannon "Momma" Lee. She began her career as the Theatre Director at Brownwood during the 2014-2015 school year. She was a student at Brownwood High School when Larry Mathis was the director. He retired at the end of the 2013-2014 school year. The Theatre Department also includes almost every kind of student; cheerleaders, band members, choir members, and athletes. The 2014 fall production was Beauty and the Beast. Donnetta Shelton is Shannon Lee's assistant, as well as the Art teacher and the Theatre Arts I teacher.

The Theatre Department won 1st division titles at both the District and Area contests in 2014 for their production of The Mill on the Floss, produced by Larry Mathis for the third time. They also won many awards, including Best Actor, several All Star Cast, Honorable Mention All Star Cast, and the Tech Award. They went on to compete at Regionals.

State titles
One Act Play
1967 (3A)

Notable alumni
Bob Denver, lead actor in Gilligan's Island
Larry Elkins, two-time All-American flanker at Baylor, and later for the AFL's Houston Oilers
Jimmy Harris, former NFL defensive back
Shawn Hollingsworth, football player
Robert E. Howard, fantasy and sci-fi writer, creator of Conan the Barbarian
Bart Johnson, wide receiver for TCU Horned Frogs football team and Cincinnati Bengals
Matt McCrane, kicker for Kansas State and several NFL teams
Shelby Miller, Major League Baseball Pitcher 
Jim Morris, former MLB pitcher for Tampa Bay Rays
Casey Pachall, quarterback for the TCU Horned Frogs football team, Toronto Argonauts
Dave Ribble, former NFL guard
Roy Spence, founder of GSD&M Idea City
Larry D. Thomas, 2008 Texas Poet Laureate
Jim Thomason, former Detroit Lions halfback
Kenny Vaccaro, safety for Texas Longhorns and New Orleans Saints, now he plays for the Tennessee Titans
Bob Young, former NFL lineman

References

External links
 

Schools in Brown County, Texas
Public high schools in Texas